Parilimyidae is a family of bivalves belonging to the superorder Anomalodesmata. 

Genera:
 Kanakimya Campbell & Grant-Mackie, 1995
 Panacca Dall, 1905
 Parilimya Melvill & Standen, 1899
 Procardia Meek, 1871

References

 Morton B. (1981). The Anomalodesmata. Malacologia 21 (1-2): 35-60
 Morton B. (1982). The functional morphology of Parilimya fragilis (Bivalvia: Parilimyidae fam. nov.) with a discussion on the origin and evolution of the carnivorous septibranchs and a reclassification of the Anomalodesmata. Transactions of the Zoological Society of London 36(3): 153-216
 Bieler, R.; Carter, J. G.; Coan, E. V. (2010). Classification of Bivalve families. Pp. 113-133, in: Bouchet P. & Rocroi J.-P. (2010), Nomenclator of Bivalve Families. Malacologia. 52(2): 1-184

External links
 Morton B. & Machado F.M. (2019). Predatory marine bivalves: A review. Advances in Marine Biology. 84: 1-98

Anomalodesmata
Bivalve families